The 1988 NCAA Division I Men's Golf Championships were contested at the 50th annual NCAA-sanctioned golf tournament for determining the individual and team national champions of men's collegiate golf at the Division I level in the United States.

The tournament was held at the North Ranch Country Club in Thousand Oaks, California.

UCLA won the team championship, the Bruins' first NCAA title.

E.J. Pfister, from Oklahoma State, won the individual title, the third consecutive win for an OSU golfer.

Individual results

Individual champion
 E. J. Pfister, Oklahoma State (284)

Team results

Finalists

Eliminated after 54 holes

Eliminated after 36 holes

DC = Defending champions
Debut appearance

References

NCAA Men's Golf Championship
Golf in California
NCAA Golf Championship
NCAA Golf Championship
NCAA Golf Championship